Fordoun railway station served the village of Fordoun, Aberdeenshire, Scotland from 1849 to 1956 on the Aberdeen Railway.

History 
The station opened on 1 November 1849 to the Aberdeen Railway. The station closed to both passengers and goods traffic on 11 June 1956.

References

External links 

Former Caledonian Railway stations
Railway stations in Great Britain opened in 1849
Railway stations in Great Britain closed in 1956
1849 establishments in Scotland
1956 disestablishments in Scotland